Pompeius, or Pompey (106 BC–48 BC), was a leading Roman general and statesman.

Pompeius may also refer to:

Pompeia gens, a plebeian family of ancient Rome, with a list of notable people with the name, including:
Pompeius (consul 501) (died 532), consul of the Eastern Roman Empire

Pompeius (butterfly), a genus of skippers

See also
Pompeia
Pompey (disambiguation)
Pompeii (disambiguation)
Pompeia (disambiguation)
Sextus Pompeius (disambiguation)